Oakview is a rural locality in the Gympie Region, Queensland, Australia. In the  Oakview had a population of 29 people. It is an historic mining area and now grazing country.

Geography 
The southern half and northern edge of Oakview are mountainous with lower flatter land in-between. The lower land has an elevation of 100–150 metres above sea level and is used for grazing. The northern edge contains Sugarloaf Mountain (340 metres above sea level) and is undeveloped land. The southern half rises to an unnamed peak at 630 metres above sea level and is part of the Oakview State Forest and the Oakview National Park.

Wide Bay Creek meanders from west to east through the northern flatter part of the locality; it is a tributary of the Mary River.

Oakview was served by the Oakview railway station. The Wide Bay Highway runs from east to west through the flatter land to the south of the railway line.

Ecology 
The Oakview National Park contains a bottle tree (Brachychiton) scrub with two near-threatened flora: the giant ironwood Choricarpia subargentea and the Rhodamnia pauciovulata. It is also the habitat of  the endangered gecko Phyllurus kabikabi and Nangur spiny skink Nangura spinosa.

History 

The Oakview Provisional School opened in 1895. It closed temporarily in 1901, reopening in 1902. In 1913, it became a half-time school, sharing its teacher with Running Creek Provisional School. In 1914 it resumed its full-time status but closed later that year. The school reopened as Oakview State School on 12 September 1918, but closed again in 1928. It reopened for the last time on 1 June 1937 as Oakview State School and closed permanently in 1963.

Oakview sawmill was operated by the Spencer Brothers from 1934 to 1971. It was located near the Oakview railway station.

In 2001,  of Oakview State Forest was converted to Oakview Forest Reserve in order to converse its ecosystem. In 2009,  of the forest reserve was converted to Oakview National Park while the other  became a Resource Reserve to allow mining exploration (the south-western area of the locality having been mined for copper in the 1860s and 1870s). After the mining exploration was completed, the resource reserve land was added to the converted to national park.

In the  Oakview had a population of 29 people.

Heritage listings 

Oakview has the following heritage listings:
 Rossmore Road, in the upper reaches of Fat Hen Creek: Mount Clara smelter

References

External links 

Gympie Region
Localities in Queensland